Closer Economic Partnership Arrangement (CEPA,  Hanyu Pinyin: Gēng Jǐnmì Jīngmào Guānxì) are economic and trade agreement between the separate customs territories within the People's Republic of China.

The Closer Economic Partnership Arrangements which are in effect:
Mainland and Hong Kong Closer Economic Partnership Arrangement
Mainland and Macau Closer Economic Partnership Arrangement

See also
 Economic Cooperation Framework Agreement, economic agreement between the PRC Government and the ROC Government